Batocera ushijimai is a species of beetle in the family Cerambycidae. It was described by N. Ohbayashi in 1981. It is known from Taiwan.

References

Batocerini
Beetles described in 1981
Beetles of Asia